Giuseppe Pietri (Sant'Ilario, frazione of Marina di Campo, comune of Campo nell'Elba, 6 May 1886 – Milan, 11 August 1946) was an Italian composer, known primarily for his work in operetta.  Excerpts from one of his works, the opera Maristella, were widely recorded and continue to be so on CD.  The aria "Io conosco un giardino" from that work has been popular with tenors, and has been frequently recorded separately; among the singers to record it are Luciano Pavarotti, Beniamino Gigli, Joseph Calleja and more recently, Rolando Villazón.
Pietri studied composition at the Milan Conservatory at Gaetano Coronato. He studied harmony and counterpoint with Amintore Galli. He composed operas in versistical tradition, but it was his operettas that made him a popular success. He developed an independent Italian idiom for the operetta. The most famous was L'acqua cheta, which premiered in Rome in 1920. The text was from a 1908 Tuscan dialect piece by Augusto Novelli, a romantic comedy in the Florentine petty bourgeois style. Rompicollo was premiered in 1928 in Milan, and was translated into German as Das große Rennen ("The Big Race").

Works

Operas
 Calendimaggio, libretto by Pietro Gori, Florence 1910
 Ruy Blas, based on Victor Hugo, Bologna 1916
 Maristella, Naples 1934 (excerpts available on CD from Myto Records, with Rina Gigli and Agostino Lazzari, 1956)
 Bionda Rondine, Livorno 1937
 La canzone di San Giovanni, San Remo 1939

Operettas
 In Flemmerland, libretto by Antonio Rubino, Teatro Fossati, Milan, 1913
 Addio giovinezza ("Adieu, Youth"), libretto by Sandro Camasio and Nino Oxilia, Teatro Goldoni, Livorno, 1915
 La modella, libretto by Antonio Lega and Alfredo Testoni, Teatro Quirino, Rome, 1917
 Lucciola, libretto by Carlo Veneziani, Teatro Leopoldo, Livorno, 1918
 L'acqua cheta ("Still Waters"), libretto by Augusto Novelli and Angelo Nessi, National Dramatic Theatre, Rome, 1920
 L'ascensione, libretto by Augusto Novelli, Teatro della Pergola, Florence, 1922
 Guarda, guarda la mostarda!, libretto by Giovanni Antonio Colonna di Cesarò, Teatro dei Piccoli, Rome, 1923
 La donna perduta, libretto by Guglielmo Zorzi and Guglielmo Giannini, Teatro Adriano, Rome, 1923
 Quartetto vagabondo, libretto by Enrico Serretta, Teatro Eliseo, Rome, 1924
 Namba Zaim, libretto by Carlo Veneziani, Teatro Lirico, Milan, 1926
 Prima Rosa, libretto by Carlo Lombardo and Renato Simoni, Teatro Lirico, Milan, 1926
 Tuffolina, libretto by Augusto Novelli, Politeama, Genoa, 1927
 Rompicollo ("The Race"), libretto by Luigi Bonelli and Ferdinando Paolieri, Teatro Dal Verme, Milan, 1928
 L'isola verde, libretto by Carlo Lombardo, Teatro Lirico, Milan, 1929
 Casa mia casa mia ..., libretto by Augusto Novelli and Angelo Nessi, Teatro Quirino, Rome, 1930
 Gioconda Zappaterra, libretto by Giulio Bucciolini, Teatro Alfieri, Florence, 1930
 La dote di Jeannette, libretto by Arturo Rossato, Teatro Principe, Rome, 1931
 Vent'anni, libretto by Luigi Bonelli, Teatro Quirino, Rome, 1932

References

Buzzi, Vittore, Le vie di Milano, Hoepli Editore, 2005, p. 320. 
 GIUSEPPE BARDONE "VITA ED OPERE DI GIUSEPPE PIETRI" ACADEMIA EDU 2016

External links
Concerto con le musiche di Pietri, Comune di Arezzo, 25 October 2006 (Photograph)

1886 births
1946 deaths
Italian classical composers
Italian male classical composers
Italian opera composers
Male opera composers
People from the Province of Livorno
Milan Conservatory alumni
20th-century classical composers
20th-century Italian composers
20th-century Italian male musicians